Il re di Poggioreale (internationally released as Black City and The King of Poggioreale) is a 1961 Italian comedy-drama film directed by Duilio Coletti. It is based on real life events of camorra criminal Peppino Navarra.

It stars the American actors Ernest Borgnine and Keenan Wynn.

Plot

Cast 
Ernest Borgnine: Peppino Navarra
Keenan Wynn: Di Gennaro
David Opatoshu: commissioner Natalucci
Yvonne Sanson: Mariannina
Cristina Gaioni: Pupetta 
Salvo Randone: vescovo
Lino Ventura: bandit
Sergio Tofano: count Pignatelli
Aldo Giuffrè: brigadiere Crisquolo   
Max Cartier: Enrico 
Carlo Pisacane: Abbate
Rosita Pisano: Donna Amalia
Giacomo Furia: ministro Califano
Nino Vingelli: ministro Sgarra
Renato Terra: agente
Guido Celano

References

External links

1961 films
Films directed by Duilio Coletti
Italian comedy-drama films
1961 comedy-drama films
Films about the Camorra
Films produced by Dino De Laurentiis
1960s Italian films